Joseph Tkach may refer to:

 Joseph W. Tkach (1927–1995), second Pastor General of the Worldwide Church of God
 Joseph Tkach Jr. (born 1951), third Pastor General of the Worldwide Church of God